Duane B. "Duke" Sims (born June 5, 1941) is an American former professional baseball catcher. He played eleven seasons in Major League Baseball (MLB) from 1964 to 1974 for the Cleveland Indians, Los Angeles Dodgers, Detroit Tigers, New York Yankees, and Texas Rangers.

From 1964 through 1970 he was a mainstay of the Cleveland Indians and caught Indians pitcher Sam McDowell through his minor and major league career. The Indians pitching staff of 1965-1970 was recognized as one of the best 4 men staffs in an era with starters going every fourth day. After posting his best offensive year in 1971 playing left field, right field, first base and catching, Sims was traded 2 for 1 to the Los Angeles Dodgers for Alan Foster and Ray Lamb and hit a career high .274 in 1971.

Placed on waivers by the Dodgers, Billy Martin took him to the Detroit Tigers in August 1972. His first game as a Tiger resulted in a 3 for 5 day with a game-tying double and  the game-winning single off of Gaylord Perry, who would win the Cy Young Award that year. He subsequently  hit .316 with 10 game-winning or game-tying hits while catching for the Tigers for the rest of that season, in which the Tigers won in the A.L. East Championship. Sims played in all 5 games in the championship series, both in left field and catching. He was the catcher in Game 2 when Oakland Athletics shortstop Bert Campaneris threw the bat at Tigers pitcher Lerrin LaGrow after being hit on the ankle.

Duke left the Tigers in September 1973, and caught the final game in Yankee Stadium before it was torn down and gutted. He joined the Yankees in the 1974 season in which they played their home games at Shea Stadium before being traded to the Texas Rangers on May 7 for Larry Gura and cash. Sims retired at the end of that 1974 season.

Duke holds the distinction of finishing his career with exactly 100 home runs, the current record for a player hailing from the state of Utah. Sims is also credited as the last person to hit a home run in the original Yankee Stadium in 1973. He did it as a member of the Yankees in an 8–5 loss to the Detroit Tigers on September 30.

References

External links

Living people
1941 births
Major League Baseball catchers
Cleveland Indians players
Los Angeles Dodgers players
Detroit Tigers players
New York Yankees players
Texas Rangers players
Baseball players from Salt Lake City
North Platte Indians players
Selma Cloverleafs players
Burlington Indians players (1958–1964)
Charleston Indians players
Nashville Vols players
Portland Beavers players